The Institute of Contemporary Music Performance (ICMP, formerly known as the Guitar Institute), is an independent music education provider located in London, United Kingdom. The school currently has two sites, one in Kilburn and another in Queen's Park.

History
Founded in 1985, by session guitarist Alan Limbrick, the Institute was originally known as The Guitar Institute & BassTech, and was focused exclusively on training and developing guitarists and bassists. The 'tech' names were later dropped and the Institute retained the 'Guitar Institute' name. The school now also offers courses in drums, vocals, songwriting, music production, audio engineering, music business and digital marketing.

Notable alumni
Notable alumni include:
 Ben Sargeant (The Script)
Cathy Dennis
Charlie Brown and Jules Konieczny (APRE)
Daughter
Ed O'Brien (Radiohead)
 Etta Bond
 Foxes
Fraser T Smith (producer)
 Julia Lamb (Tom Grennan)
 Luke Patterson (Clean Bandit)
Matty Brown (Drummer) - Stormzy, Olly Murs
Ny Oh (multi-instrumentalist) - Neon Gru, Harry Styles
Rob Chapman
Sandy Beales (Bass) - One Direction

References

External links
 

Music schools in London
Educational institutions established in 1985
1985 establishments in England